was a Sengoku period Japanese castle located in what is now the city of Shirakawa, northern Fukushima Prefecture, Japan. It should not be confused with the later "Shirakawa Castle" of the Edo period, which was more properly known as  Komine Castle. The castle site was granted government protection as a National Historic Site of Japan in 2016.

Situation
Shirakawa Castle is located about 2 kilometers southeast of the center of Shirakawa City, on the right bank of the Abukuma River.  It is built on a 400-meter elevation mountain ridge, extending about 950 meters east–west by 550 meters north–south. As was common with mountain castles of the time, the fortifications consisted of number of separate enclosures on the mountain, individually protected by clay ramparts and dry moats.

History 
The Yūki clan was originally a local samurai band from Shimotsuke Province. Minamoto no Yoritomo's wet nurse was a woman from the Yūki clan, and after the formation of the Kamakura shogunate, the Yūki clan assisted in his many battles and were awarded many estates, including a shōen in the Shirakawa area. The cadet branch of the family who settled in Shirakawa built Karame Castle as their main base, and Komine Castle as a branch. By the end of the 15th century, the clan controlled a large territory in southern Mutsu Province and Shimotsuke Province.  However, into the Sengoku period, the Shirakawa-Yūki came into conflict with the Komine-Yūki, and also came under attack from their powerful and aggressive neighbors, the Ashina clan and the Satake clan. To make matters worse, they failed to submit to Toyotomi Hideyoshi at the time for the 1590 Battle of Odawara and were dispossessed, becoming vassals of the Date clan. Shirakawa Castle was abandoned around that time.

The ruins of the castle were partially excavated from 2010 to 2015 by the Shirakawa City Board of Education, and remains and artifacts from the 14th to 16th centuries were identified, leading to its National Historic Site designation in 2016.

See also
List of Historic Sites of Japan (Fukushima)

Literature

References

External links
Shirakawa City official home page

Castles in Fukushima Prefecture
Ruined castles in Japan
Historic Sites of Japan
Shirakawa, Fukushima
Mutsu Province